Talts is an Estonian surname. Notable people with the surname include:

Jaan Talts (born 1944), Estonian weightlifter 
Janar Talts (born 1983), Estonian basketball player
Evelin Talts (born 1977), Estonian long-distance runner

Estonian-language surnames